Mai is a municipality out of four municipalities of Ilam District of Province No. 1 of Nepal. It was formed in May 2017 with merging some VDC. Mahamai, Danabari and Chisapani VDCs were merged. The municipality is divided into ten wards which is surrounded by Deumai Municipality and Ilam Municipality from north, Suryodaya Municipality from north-east, Jhapa District from south-east and Mangsebung and Chulachuli Rural Municipality from west.

According to 2011 Census of Nepal, it had population of 33,210 people, in which female comprises 17,111.

After winning the local election of 2022, Khamba Singh Limbu was elected as a mayor and Hima Bhandari elected as a deputy mayor in Mai Municipality.

References

Populated places in Ilam District
Municipalities in Koshi Province
Nepal municipalities established in 2017
Municipalities in Ilam District